Garden of Springs, Chandigarh, is a park situated in Sector 53 of Chandigarh, India. It was inaugurated on 10 December 2015 by Chandigarh UT adviser, Vijay Devon.

References

Parks in Chandigarh